Frederick Harrison Corey (1855 – November 27, 1912) was an American pitcher and third baseman in Major League Baseball in  and from  through , encompassing seven seasons.  He played for the Providence Grays, Worcester Ruby Legs, and Philadelphia Athletics.  Corey was born in Coventry, Rhode Island, and died in Providence, Rhode Island, and is interred at the North Burial Ground. Corey twice cost himself a potential home run by failing to touch third base: first, on 9/23/1880 vs. Boston, then again, on 9/17/1881 vs. Cleveland. "These would have been the first two homers in his career, which ended up with a total of seven."

References

External links

 Fred Corey at SABR (Baseball BioProject)

1855 births
1912 deaths
19th-century baseball players
Major League Baseball third basemen
Major League Baseball pitchers
Baseball players from Rhode Island
Providence Grays players
Worcester Ruby Legs players
Philadelphia Athletics (AA) players
Rhode Islands players
Capital City of Albany players
Rochester Hop Bitters players
Stillwater (minor league baseball) players
Minor league baseball managers
People from Coventry, Rhode Island
Burials at North Burying Ground (Providence)